The Main Ingredient was an American soul and R&B group best known for their 1972 hit song "Everybody Plays the Fool".

Early history
The group was formed in Harlem, New York City in 1964 as a trio called the Poets, composed of lead singer Donald McPherson (July 9, 1941 – July 3, 1971), Luther Simmons Jr. (September 9, 1942 – May 9, 2016), and Panama-born Tony Silvester (October 7, 1941 – November 26, 2006). They made their first recordings for Leiber & Stoller's Red Bird label, but soon changed their name to the Insiders and signed with RCA Records. In 1968, after a couple of singles, they changed their name once again, this time permanently, to The Main Ingredient. The name came from a Coca-Cola bottle.

They then teamed up with record producer/arranger Bert DeCoteaux. Under his direction, The Main Ingredient reached the R&B Top 30 for the first time in 1970 with "You've Been My Inspiration". A cover of The Impressions' "I'm So Proud" broke the Top 20, and "Spinning Around (I Must Be Falling in Love)" went into the Top 10. In 1971, they scored again, with the McPherson-penned black-power anthem "Black Seeds Keep on Growing," but tragedy struck that year. Don McPherson, who had been suddenly taken ill with leukemia, died unexpectedly on July 3, 1971, at age 29. Stunned, Tony Silvester and Luther Simmons re-grouped with new lead singer Cuba Gooding Sr., who had served as a backing vocalist on some of their previous recordings, and had filled in on tour during McPherson's brief illness.

The Gooding era began auspiciously with the million-selling smash "Everybody Plays the Fool", which hit number two R&B and number three pop to become the group's biggest hit. It sold over one million copies and was awarded a gold disc by the R.I.A.A. in September 1972. The accompanying album, Bitter Sweet, became their first to hit the Top 10 on the R&B album chart; its follow-up, 1973's Afrodisiac, featured several songs written or co-written by Stevie Wonder, although it did not produce any huge successes on the singles charts. They peaked at number eight on the R&B chart in 1974 with "Just Don't Want to Be Lonely", which sold over a million copies,
and also reached number ten on the Billboard Hot 100. The track peaked at number twenty-seven in the UK Singles Chart in July 1974, although it was their only chart presence in the UK. In 1975, the group recorded several songs co-written by Leon Ware, including the R&B Top Ten "Rolling Down a Mountainside". By this point, however, Tony Silvester was harboring other ambitions; he released a solo album called Magic Touch that year, and left the group to form a production team with DeCoteaux. The two of them scored a Top 10 Pop and R&B smash with their production of Ben E. King's hit "Supernatural Thing" in 1975.

Later years

Silvester was replaced by Carl Tompkins, and Gooding departed for a solo career on Motown in 1977, which produced two albums; Simmons, meanwhile, left the music industry to work as a stockbroker. Gooding, Silvester and Simmons reunited as the Main Ingredient in 1979, and recorded two more albums, 1980's Ready for Love and 1981's I Only Have Eyes for You (the latter featured a minor hit in "Evening of Love"). The trio reunited for a second time in 1986, but their Zakia single "Do Me Right" flopped, and Simmons returned to his day job. He was replaced by Jerome Jackson on the 1989 Polydor album I Just Wanna Love You. In the wake of Aaron Neville's Top Ten revival of "Everybody Plays the Fool", Gooding resumed his solo career and issued his third album in 1993. Silvester and Simmons re-formed the Main Ingredient in 1999 with new lead singer Carlton Blount; this line-up recorded Pure Magic in 2001.

Tony Silvester died after a six-year struggle with multiple myeloma on November 26, 2006, at the age of 65, and original member Luther Simmons retired shortly thereafter. Simmons died on May 9, 2016 at the age of 74. Cuba Gooding Sr. was found dead in his car on April 20, 2017. 

The line-up of the group consisted of Jerome Jackson and Stanley Alston. On August 13, 2020, Alston died from ALS in his hometown of Palm Coast, FL at age 66.

Discography

Studio albums

Compilation albums

Singles

 Single credited to The Poets
 Single credited to The Insiders

Notes

References

External links

The Main Ingredient on Soul Tracks
 

American soul musical groups
African-American musical groups
Musical groups established in 1964
Musical groups from Harlem
Polydor Records artists
RCA Records artists